Cavani may refer to:
Edinson Cavani (born 1987), Uruguayan footballer
Ernesto Filippi Cavani (born 1950), former Uruguayan football referee
Liliana Cavani (born 1933), Italian director and screenwriter
Stade Cavani, a stadium on Mayotte, a French territory in the Indian Ocean

Surnames of Italian origin